The Canadian League of Rights (CLR) was the Canadian offshoot of Eric Butler's Australian League of Rights. Following speaking tours of Canada in the mid-1960s, Eric Butler sought to establish of a local version of his organisation. The CLR was formed in 1968.

The CLR was run for most of its existence by Ron Gostick and Patrick Walsh. Like its sister organisations, the CLR adheres to social credit and anti-semitism. Academic Stanley Barrett, author of Is God a Racist? The Right Wing in Canada and various studies race and ethnicity in Canada, suggested that the CLR had 10,000 members at its peak. The CLR was described as "one of Canada's largest and best organized anti-Semitic groups" in the 1987 book A Trust Betrayed.  A notable member was Jim Keegstra. 

The CLR linked with various groups such as the Alliance for the Preservation of English in Canada and ran a book service selling Holocaust denial material. The third Crown Commonwealth League of Rights conference was held in 1983 in Canada. The CLR supported a tour of Canada by David Irving in 1991.

See also
Australian League of Rights
British League of Rights
New Zealand League of Rights

References

Anti-communist organizations
Canadian far-right political movements
Canadian social credit movement
Holocaust denial in Canada
Organizations established in 1988